The Lesotho Davis Cup team represents Lesotho in Davis Cup tennis competition and are governed by the Lesotho Lawn Tennis Association.  They have not competed since 2001.

History
Lesotho competed in its first Davis Cup in 2000.  Their best result was fourth in their Group IV pool in 2000 and 2001.

Last team (2001) 

 Ntsane Moeletsi
 Lebohang Tšasanyane
 Mabusetsa Siimane
 Sekhoke Moshoeshoe

See also
Davis Cup
Lesotho Fed Cup team

External links

Davis Cup teams
Davis Cup
Davis Cup